Riverside Park is an unincorporated community in Humboldt County, California. Area buildings are primarily summer home properties along the river.

References

Unincorporated communities in California